Bencsik is a Hungarian surname. Notable people with the surname include:

Gábor Bencsik (born 1980), Hungarian rower
János Bencsik (born  1965), Hungarian politician
Mária Bencsik (born 1939), Hungarian gymnast

Hungarian-language surnames